Kpandai is one of the constituencies represented in the Parliament of Ghana. It elects one Member of Parliament (MP) by the first past the post system of election. It is located in the Northern Region of Ghana. The current member of Parliament for the constituency is Daniel Nsala Wakpal. He was elected  on the ticket of the National Democratic Congress (NDC) and  won a majority of 2,073 votes more than the candidate closest in the race, to win the constituency election to become the MP. He took over from the MP Mathew Nyindam who  represented the constituency in the 6th Republican parliament on the ticket of the New Patriotic Party and had another chance to represent the constituency for another four years after winning the 2016 election once again7th Republican Parliament on the ticket of New Patriotic Party.

However, The Deputy chief whip lost to his main contender, Daniel Nsala Wakpal of the opposition National Democratic Congress (NDC  after polling 23,669 votes against the NDC candidate's 25,941 votes. The current member of Parliament for Kpandai Constituency Daniel Nsala Wakpal represents MPs elected in the Ghanaian Parliamentary election, 2020/8th Republican Parliament on the ticket of National Democratic Congress.

Members of Parliament

Boundaries
The seat is located within the Kpandai district of the Northern Region of Ghana.

See also
List of Ghana Parliament constituencies

References 

Parliamentary constituencies in the Northern Region (Ghana)